Prithvi Raj Awashti (Nepali:पृथ्वीराज अवस्थी) is a Nepalese politician, belonging to the Communist Party of Nepal (Unified Marxist-Leninist). He contested the Baitadi-1 constituency as a CPN (UML) candidate in the 1999 legislative election and the 1994 election. He finished in second place both times.

References

Communist Party of Nepal (Unified Marxist–Leninist) politicians
Living people
Year of birth missing (living people)